Jack Higginson (born 4 April 1997) is an Ireland international rugby league footballer who plays as a  or er for the Rochdale Hornets in the Betfred League 1.

Career

Rochdale Hornets
On 29 January 2020 it was announced that Higginson has signed for Rochdale Hornets

International
He was named in the Ireland squad for the 2017 Rugby League World Cup.

References

External links
Wigan Warriors profile
SL profile
2017 RLWC profile

1997 births
Living people
English rugby league players
English people of Irish descent
Ireland national rugby league team players
Leigh Leopards players
Rochdale Hornets players
Rugby league wingers
Rugby league centres
Rugby league players from Rochdale
Swinton Lions players
Wigan Warriors players
Workington Town players